Shigar District is one of the 14 districts of Pakistani territory of Gilgit-Baltistan.  The district is bounded on the north by the Nagar District, the Hunza District, and the Kashgar Prefecture of China's Xinjiang Uyghur Autonomous Region, on the south-east by the Ghanche District, on the south-west by the Rondu District and the Skardu District, and on the west by the Gilgit District. The Shigar District was established in 2015, prior to which time it had been  part of the Skardu District.

The district is home to the world's second-highest peak, K2.

References 

 
Districts of Gilgit-Baltistan